The men's 100 metre butterfly competition at the 2022 Mediterranean Games was held on 5 July 2022 at the Aquatic Center of the Olympic Complex in Bir El Djir.

Records
Prior to this competition, the existing world and Mediterranean Games records were as follows:

The following new records were set during this competition.

Results

Heats
The heats were started at 10:00.

Final 
The final was held at 18:00.

References

Men's 100 metre butterfly